is a former Japanese football player.

Club statistics

1Includes J.League Championship, A3 Champions Cup, Japanese Super Cup, Pan-Pacific Championship, Suruga Bank Championship, FIFA Club World Cup, Promotion Playoffs to J1 and J2/J3 Playoffs.

Team honors
Yokohama F. Marinos
J1 League - 2004
Gamba Osaka
AFC Champions League - 2008
Pan-Pacific Championship - 2008
Emperor's Cup - 2008, 2009

References

External links

1981 births
Living people
Kokushikan University alumni
Association football people from Kyoto Prefecture
Japanese footballers
J1 League players
J2 League players
J3 League players
Yokohama F. Marinos players
Oita Trinita players
Gamba Osaka players
Sanfrecce Hiroshima players
Montedio Yamagata players
Zweigen Kanazawa players
Thespakusatsu Gunma players
Association football forwards
Universiade medalists in football
Universiade gold medalists for Japan